List of Governors of the Mexican state of Aguascalientes.

Aguascalientes
1835 establishments in Mexico